The Growing Pains of Adrian Mole is a British television series based on the book of the same name written by Sue Townsend. It aired from 5 January to 9 February 1987 and starred Gian Sammarco, as the title character Adrian Mole, Stephen Moore as Adrian's father George Mole and Lulu as Adrian's mother Pauline Mole.

Characters

Mole family

Adrian Mole (Gian Sammarco) is the main character and narrator.
George Mole (Stephen Moore) is Adrian's father and estranged to Pauline.
Pauline Mole (Lulu) is Adrian's mother, who left her husband George in The Secret Diary of Adrian Mole to live with Mr. Lucas.
May 'Grandma' Mole (Beryl Reid) is George Mole's mother and Adrian's grandmother.
Rosie Mole is Adrian's baby sister.

Other characters

Bert Baxter (Bill Fraser) is Adrian's foul-mouthed and strongly opinionated old age pensioner friend. He lives with Queenie in a bungalow, along with Bert's aggressive and unpredictable German Shepherd dog, Sabre.
Queenie Baxter (Doris Hare) is Bert Baxter's wife, who later dies of a stroke.
Pandora Braithwaite (Lindsey Stagg) is Adrian's girlfriend.
Tania Braithwaite (Louise Jameson) is Pandora's liberal-minded mother.
Ivan Braithwaite (Robin Herford) is Pandora's father.
Nigel Partridge (Steven Mackintosh) is Adrian's best friend.
Barry Kent (Chris Gascoyne) is a bully at Adrian's school who becomes friends with Adrian.
Mr 'Creep' Lucas (Paul Greenwood) is the Moles' former neighbour with whom Pauline had an affair.
Doreen 'Stick Insect' Slater (Su Elliot) is a woman with whom Adrian's father George has an affair while his wife is in Sheffield with Mr. Lucas.
Maxwell 'House' Slater (Anthony Watson) is Stick Insect's badly-behaved young son from a previous relationship. Stick Insect also gives birth to a baby boy, Brett (George being the father) during the current series and they all live with George's mother for a time.
Mr Reginald 'Popeye' Scruton (Freddie Jones) is Adrian and Pandora's abrasive and volatile headmaster, who is a huge admirer of the then-Prime Minister Margaret Thatcher.
Ms Fossington-Gore (Mary Maddox) is Adrian, Pandora and Nigel's opinionated but supportive form tutor.
Mrs Claricoates (Marian Diamond) is the school's kind-hearted and long-suffering secretary.
Courtney Elliott (John Bird) is the Moles' friendly and slightly eccentric postman, who possesses a surprisingly impressive academic background.

There were one-off appearances from several other actors, including Tony Haygarth as Bernard Porke, the ill-mannered proprietor of the Rio Grande boarding house in Skegness, where the Moles stayed during a holiday; David Ryall as Mr Reginald Gudgeon, the well-meaning but inept manager of the local benefits office, Patrick Barlow as Mitchell Malone, the excitable local radio disc jockey and Lucy Benjamin as Sharon Bott.

Episodes

References

External links

1987 British television series debuts
1987 British television series endings
1980s British comedy-drama television series
ITV comedy
Adrian Mole
British comedy-drama television shows
1980s British television miniseries
Television shows produced by Thames Television
English-language television shows
Television series about families
Television series about teenagers
Television series by Fremantle (company)
Television series set in 1982
Television series set in 1983